Susan Seaforth Hayes (born Susan Seabold;  July 11, 1943) is an American dramatic actress. She is best known for her  portrayal of Julie Williams on the NBC drama Days of Our Lives, and her intermittent portrayal of Joanna Manning on the CBS daytime drama The Young and the Restless.  She began playing the role of Julie on Days of Our Lives in 1968, and is the only actor to appear on the show for all seven decades it has been on the air.  Seaforth Hayes still regularly appears on Days as Julie.

Career

Susan Seaforth grew up in Hollywood, where she was active in theater as a teenager. Her mother, Elizabeth Harrower (1918–2003), was an actress and screenwriter who eventually became a part of the writing teams of The Young and the Restless and Days of Our Lives. Her father, Harry Seabold, lived with his bride for 90 days during World War II, through his basic training near Oklahoma City. He shipped out after his daughter was conceived and remained overseas for thirty-three months; during this time, Harrower returned to her family home in Berkeley.

Seaforth Hayes had a number of featured roles on prime-time television in the 1960s, 1970s, and 1980s.  Ms. Seaforth appeared in the TV series Cheyenne in the episode, "The Bad Penny", portraying a young murderess avenging the hanging of her outlaw father.  She appeared as Martha Otis, the wife of Jim Otis (Gil Peterson) in 1967 in Death Valley Days. She guest starred in National Velvet, The Fugitive, Redigo, The Man from U.N.C.L.E., at least two appearances on My Three Sons, plus episodes of Emergency!, Adam-12, the 1967-1970 version of Dragnet, and Matlock, starring Andy Griffith. She was in two separate episodes of Cheyenne with Clint Walker in 1962. She had a guest appearance on Perry Mason in 1962 as title character Helen Gregory in "The Case of the Stand-in Sister." In the mid 1960s, she appeared on General Hospital as the flirtatious Dorothy Bradley (1964) and later on The Young Marrieds as Carol West (1965), giving her some experience into the hectic world of daytime television soap opera.

She is best known for her work on the daytime soap opera Days of Our Lives in the role of Julie Olson Williams, which she played continuously from 1968 to 1984 and again from 1990 to 1993, with recurring appearances in 1994 and 1996. Since 1999, she has appeared on the show in a recurring capacity, often doing double duty between "Days" and "Y&R", in one case appearing on both shows on the very same day, a feat possible because of their different shooting and airing schedules.

She is the only actor to appear on Days of Our Lives in all seven decades that it has been in production.  In between appearances, she starred from November 1984 to May 1989 as Joanna Manning, mother to Tracey E. Bregman's character, Lauren Fenmore, on The Young and the Restless and as District Attorney Patricia Steele on Sunset Beach in that show's final months on the air.

The role of Stephanie Forrester on The Bold and the Beautiful was created for her by former Days headwriter William J. Bell. When she turned it down, her former Days costar Susan Flannery took the role.  However, when the character of Lauren Fenmore crossed over, Susan did reprise her role of Joanna Manning on that show for one episode in 2003, and has made several return appearances as that character on "Y&R" as Lauren's storyline required the character to be there.

Most recently, Susan made a cameo appearance in a music video for Chip Chocolate's "Cookie Dance" as Mrs. Fields.

For her work on Days, Seaforth Hayes has received four Daytime Emmy Award nominations for Outstanding Lead Actress in a Drama Series, in 1975, 1976, 1978, and 1979;  and two nominations for Outstanding Supporting Actress in a Drama Series, in 2018, and 2020.  On April 29, 2018, the National Academy of Television Arts & Sciences presented Bill Hayes and Susan Seaforth Hayes with Lifetime Achievement Awards at the 45th Annual Daytime Emmy Awards.
She was voted Best Actress in Daytime TV's Annual Reader's Poll in 1976, 1977, and 1978.  Additionally, in 1977, she won two Soapy Awards for Actress of the Year and Favorite Heroine.  She was awarded Photoplay Gold Medal Awards in 1977 and 1978, for Favorite Daytime Female Star.  She earned a degree in history from L.A's City College, and the stack of books at her deskside reflects an intense interest in the American West and diverse Native American cultures.  Seaforth Hayes has lectured at universities in Los Angeles and Boston.

Her onscreen and real-life romance with co-star Bill Hayes (Doug Williams) was widely covered by both the soap opera magazines and the mainstream press (they married in 1974). The characters of Doug and Julie were Days of our Lives''', as well as daytime TV's, first supercouple, and are widely believed to be the first supercoupling on the American daytime serials. Their appearance together on the January 12, 1976 cover of Time magazine was the only time daytime actors have appeared there. They also made an appearance on Password Plus in 1979.

In 2005, she and Hayes published their joint autobiography, Like Sands Through The Hourglass.

Major roles
Julie Olson Williams on Days of Our Lives(1968–1984, 1990–1993) [contract]
(1993–1994, 1996) [guest stints]
(1999–present) [recurring]
Joanna Manning on The Young and the Restless(1984–1989) [contract]
(2005–2007, 2010) [guest stints]
Joanna Manning on The Bold and the Beautiful(2003, 2005) [guest stints]
D.A. Patricia Steele on Sunset Beach''
(1999) [recurring]

Personal
For many years, she and her mother lived in the Alvarado Terrace Historic District of Los Angeles.

Awards and nominations

See also

Supercouple

References

External links
 

1943 births
Living people
American television actresses
American soap opera actresses
Actresses from Oakland, California
20th-century American actresses
21st-century American actresses